An earthquake struck west of Paphos, Cyprus on January 11, 2022, with a moment magnitude of 6.6. The earthquake was the largest tremor to occur in the Mediterranean Sea since the 2003 Boumerdès earthquake, and the largest to occur in Cyprus since 1996.

Tectonic setting
Cyprus is located in a complex zone of a boundary between the Anatolian and African Plates. These two plates are colliding along the Cyprus Arc, a tectonic boundary that runs south of the island. This subduction zone is offset by a small transform fault known as the Paphos Transform Fault. This plate boundary, along with the Dead Sea Transform and East Anatolian Fault Leads to motion of the African and Arabian Plates. This has resulted in moderately destructive, occasional earthquakes, including a magnitude 7.0–7.5 in 1222 which severely impacted the island and generated a large tsunami.

Earthquake
The earthquake was the largest in Cyprus since 1996, and was felt across the island as well as Turkey, Greece, Egypt, Israel and Lebanon.

Impact

Cyprus
Several structures received minor damage and objects fell from shelves in the Paphos and Lefke Districts. In Kallepeia, at least 1,586 chickens were killed in stampede caused by them panicking.

Egypt
In Damietta, the earthquake may have led to the collapse of a four-storey apartment several hours later, killing three people and injuring another. Two of the victims were men while another body had yet to be identified.

See also
List of earthquakes in Cyprus
List of earthquakes in Egypt
List of earthquakes in 2022

References

Cyprus
Earthquakes in Cyprus
Earthquakes in Egypt
Earthquakes in Turkey
2022 in Cyprus
January 2022 events in Europe
January 2022 events in Asia
January 2022 events in Africa
2022 in Northern Cyprus
2022 in Egypt
January 2022 events in Turkey
2022 disasters in Cyprus 
2022 disasters in Egypt 
2022 disasters in Turkey